Making Dens is the debut album from Mystery Jets, released in the UK on 6 March 2006. Tracks on the album include previous singles "Alas Agnes", "You Can't Fool Me Dennis" and "Zoo Time" (the last two of which have been re-recorded). "The Boy Who Ran Away" was released as a single from the album on 27 February 2006, while "Diamonds in the Dark" was released as an EP on 4 September 2006.

Track listing
All tracks written by Mystery Jets.
 "Intro" – 0:43
 "You Can't Fool Me Dennis" – 3:32
 "Purple Prose" – 4:03
 "Soluble in Air" – 3:12
 "The Boy Who Ran Away" – 2:57
 "Summertime Den" – 1:14
 "Horse Drawn Cart" – 5:00
 "Zoo Time" – 4:01
 "Little Bag of Hair" – 5:20
 "Diamonds in the Dark" – 3:57
 "Alas Agnes" – 3:51
 "Making Dens" – 6:48

References

2006 debut albums
Mystery Jets albums
679 Artists albums
Albums produced by James Ford (musician)